The men's 800 metres event at the 1959 Pan American Games was held at the Soldier Field in Chicago on 28, 29 and 30 August.

Medalists

Results

Heats

Semifinals

Final

References

Athletics at the 1959 Pan American Games
1959